Board of Trustees or board of trustees may refer to:
 Board of trustees
 Board of directors, advisors, visitors, governors, managers or regents
 Supervisory board
 Board of Trustees (Wikimedia Foundation)
 Board of Trustees (University of Chicago)

See also 
 
 
 
 Board (disambiguation)